Laoac, officially the Municipality of Laoac, is a 4th class municipality in the province of Pangasinan, Philippines. According to the 2020 census, it has a population of 34,128 people.

History
Since early 1900s, unsuccessful attempts to convert Laoac, then the biggest barrio in Manaoag, into a separate municipality were made until the revival of such movement by Don Westrimundo Tabayoyong. This led to the establishment of Laoac as a municipality through Republic Act No. 6485, which was enacted on June 17, 1972, constituting twenty barrios separated from Manaoag, including Laoac (present-day Poblacion) which was designated as the seat of government. The implementation, however, was delayed by the declaration of nationwide martial law later that year. By virtue of Batas Pambansa Blg. 18 issued in 1979, the first municipal officials were elected, with Tabayoyong as mayor, and assumed office on March 5, 1980, formally inaugurating the corporate existence of the municipality.

Laoac is currently the province's newest municipality.

Geography

Barangays
Laoac is politically subdivided into 22 barangays. These barangays are headed by elected officials: Barangay Captain, Barangay Council, whose members are called Barangay Councilors. All are elected every three years.

Anis
Balligi
Banuar
Botigue
Caaringayan
Domingo Alarcio (Cabilaoan East)
Cabilaoan
Cabulalaan
Calaoagan
Calmay
Casampagaan
Casanestebanan
Casantiagoan
Inmanduyan
Poblacion (Laoac)
Lebueg
Maraboc
Nanbagatan
Panaga
Talogtog
Turko
Yatyat

Climate

Demographics

Economy

Government
Laoac, belonging to the fifth congressional district of the province of Pangasinan, is governed by a mayor designated as its local chief executive and by a municipal council as its legislative body in accordance with the Local Government Code. The mayor, vice mayor, and the councilors are elected directly by the people through an election which is being held every three years.

Elected officials

References

External links

 Laoac Profile at PhilAtlas.com
 Municipal Profile at the National Competitiveness Council of the Philippines
 Laoac at the Pangasinan Government Website
 Local Governance Performance Management System
 [ Philippine Standard Geographic Code]
 Philippine Census Information

Municipalities of Pangasinan